Kokomo is a community on the island of Maui, Maui County, Hawaii.
It is uphill of the area known as Haikū. Contrary to popular belief, the Beach Boys' 1988 single of the same name is not based on this Hawaiian community; the song's lyrics refer instead to a fictional island near the Florida Keys.

References

External links
 Kokomo Hawaii Community Website
 Official Kokomo Hawaii Blog
 Kokomo Hawaii Info

Populated places on Maui